Rashad Khalifa (November 19, 1935 – January 31, 1990) was an Egyptian-American biochemist, closely associated with the United Submitters International (USI), an organization which promotes the practice and study of Quran-only Islam. His teachings were opposed by Traditionalist Muslims and he was assassinated on January 31, 1990. He is also known for his claims regarding the existence of a Quran code, also known as Code 19.

Life

Khalifa was born in Egypt on November 19, 1935. He obtained an honors degree from Ain Shams University, Egypt, before he emigrated to the United States in 1959. He later earned a Master's Degree in biochemistry from University of Arizona and a Ph.D. from University of California, Riverside. He became a naturalized U.S. citizen and lived in Tucson, Arizona. He was married to an American woman and they had a son and a daughter together.

Khalifa worked as a science adviser for the Libyan government for about one year, after which he worked as a chemist for the United Nations Industrial Development Organization. He next worked as a senior chemist in Arizona's State Office of Chemistry in 1980.

He founded the United Submitters International (USI), an organization that promulgated his beliefs.

Doctrine
He saw his role as purging the accretions that found their way into Islam via hadith and sunnah, which he claimed were corrupted. Instead, he believed that the beliefs and practices of Islam should be based on the Quran alone.

Starting in 1968, Khalifa used computers to analyze the frequency of letters and words in the Quran. He published his findings in 1973 in the book Miracle of the Quran: Significance of the Mysterious Alphabets, in 1981 in the book The Computer Speaks: God's Message to the World, and in 1982 in the book Quran: Visual Presentation of the Miracle. Khalifa claimed that the Quran, unlike the Hadith, was incorruptible because it contained a mathematical structure based on the number 19, namely the Quran code or known as Code 19. For example, he claimed that this mathematical structure rejected the Quranic verses 9:128-129. Some Muslims objected to this interpretation. However, Khalifa believed this mathematical structure prevented the Quran from being adulterated and that it was proof of its divine authorship.

Khalifa's research did not receive much attention in the West. In 1980, Martin Gardner mentioned it in Scientific American. Gardner later wrote a more extensive and critical review of Khalifa and his work.

Assassination
On January 31, 1990, Khalifa was found stabbed to death inside the Masjid (Mosque) of Tucson, Arizona, which he founded. He was stabbed multiple times. 

Nineteen years after the murder, on April 28, 2009, the Calgary Police Services of Canada arrested Glen Cusford Francis, a 52-year-old citizen of Trinidad and Tobago, on suspicion of having killed Rashad Khalifa. Investigators in Tucson learned that Francis, who was going by the name Benjamin Phillips, had begun his studies under Khalifa in January 1990. Phillips disappeared shortly after the slaying, and was said to have left the country. An investigation revealed Phillips and Francis were the same man when the police analyzed fingerprints found in Phillips' apartment. A specialty unit of the Tucson Police Department progressed in its investigation in 2006 and in December 2008, and was able to use DNA testing on forensic evidence from the crime scene to tie Francis to the assassination. In October 2009, a Canadian judge ordered Francis's extradition to the United States to face trial. 

The trial for the murder began on December 11, 2012. On December 19, the jury, after a three-hour deliberation, found Glen Francis guilty of first-degree murder and sentenced him to life in prison. Prior to the Francis trial, James Williams, an alleged member of the Jamaat ul-Fuqra organization, was convicted of conspiracy in the slaying. Williams disappeared in 1994 on the day of his sentencing. In 2000, Williams was apprehended attempting to re-enter the United States and was sentenced to serve 69 years in prison. In 2003, his convictions were upheld on appeal by the Colorado Court of Appeals, except for one count of forgery.

Bibliography
 Miracle of the Quran: Significance of the Mysterious Alphabets, Islamic Productions, St. Louis, Missouri, 1973.
 The Computer Speaks: God's Message to the World, Renaissance Productions, Tucson, Arizona, 1981.
 Qur'an: The Final Scripture, Islamic Productions, Tucson, Arizona, 1981.
 Qur'an: Visual Presentation of the Miracle, Islamic Productions, Tucson, Arizona, 1982.
 Qur'an, Hadith and Islam, Islamic Productions, Tucson, Arizona, 1982.
 Qur'an: The Final Testament, Islamic Productions, Tucson, Arizona, 1989.

References

Further reading
 R. Khalifa,  Quran: Visual Presentation of the Miracle, Islamic Productions International, 1982. 
 R. Khalifa, Authorized English Translation
 R. Khalifa, Authorized English Translation
 R. Khalifa, The Computer Speaks: God's Message to the World, Islamic Productions International, 1981. 
 R. Khalifa, Quran, Hadith, And Islam, Universal Unity, 2000. .
 Y.Y. Haddad and J.I. Smith, Mission to America; Five Islamic Sectarian Communities in North America, University Press of Florida, 1993.  .
 A.Y. Musa, Hadith as Scripture (Palgrave, 2008)

See also
 Criticism of Hadith

External links
 Masjid Tucson (The official website of the Mosque in the city where Rashad Khalifa preached)

1935 births
1990 deaths
1990 murders in the United States
Ain Shams University alumni
American biochemists
American imams
American Quranist Muslims
American terrorism victims
Arizona State University alumni
Assassinated American people
Assassinated religious leaders
Assassinated Egyptian people
Deaths by stabbing in Arizona
Egyptian chemists
Egyptian emigrants to the United States
Egyptian people murdered abroad
Egyptian Quranist Muslims
Egyptian scientists
People murdered in Arizona
Quranic exegesis scholars
Translators of the Quran into English
University of California, Riverside alumni
Quranist Muslims
American Muslims